DQ may stand for:

In arts and entertainment
Dragon Quest, a series of console role-playing games created by Enix (now Square Enix)
 DragonQuest, a role-playing game created by SPI

Businesses
 Dairy Queen, a fast food chain
 Coastal Air Transport (IATA code DQ)

People
 DQ (artist), Danish singer, participant in Eurovision Song Contest 2007
 Dan Quayle, American politician
 Dulquer Salmaan, Indian actor and singer
 Dan Quinn (American football), football coach

In science and technology
 HLA DQ, a human leukocyte antigen type protein
 Data quality, various measures in information science
 Design qualification, part of verification and validation
Digital Intelligence Quotient, a form of intelligence that combines knowledge in information technology and the socio-emotional ability to interact effectively through this medium
 Double-ended queue, a data type in computer science

In sport
 Disqualification (boxing)
 Disqualification (professional wrestling)
 Disqualification (tennis)

Other uses
 DQ code, used in telephone directory assistance in the UK
 Jarvis Island (FIPS PUB 10-4 territory code DQ)